Amandeep Singh (born 8 March 1988) is an Indian footballer who plays as a goalkeeper for Punjab FC in the I-League.

Career

Churchill Brothers
Singh made his debut for Churchill Brothers S.C. on 22 September 2012 during a Federation Cup match against Mohammedan at the Kanchenjunga Stadium in Siliguri, West Bengal in which he started the match as Churchill Brothers won the match 1–5.

Career statistics

Club
Statistics accurate as of 12 May 2013

References

External links
Goal.com Profile

1988 births
Living people
Indian footballers
Churchill Brothers FC Goa players
Association football midfielders
Tollygunge Agragami FC players